We Dance may refer to:

We Dance, a Wii game companion to We Sing
"We Dance", a song by Pavement on the album Wowee Zowee
We Dance. EP